A&M Records was an American record label founded as an independent company by Herb Alpert and Jerry Moss in 1962. Due to the success of the discography A&M released, the label garnered interest and was acquired by PolyGram in 1989 and began distributing releases from Polydor Ltd. from the UK. 

PolyGram was acquired by Seagram and dissolved into Universal Music Group in 1998, and A&M's operations were ceased in January 1999 when it was merged with Geffen Records and Interscope Records to form the record company Interscope Geffen A&M Records. In 2007, Interscope Geffen A&M announced that A&M was revived as trademark and brand and was to be merged with Octone Records to form A&M Octone Records, which operated until 2014, when A&M Octone was folded into Interscope. Today, A&M's catalog releases are managed by Verve Records, Universal Music Enterprises and Interscope.

Despite the shutdown in 1999 and the name being phased out during the 2000s, present-day Sting releases continue to bear the A&M name & logo.

History

Founding
A&M Records was formed in 1962 by Herb Alpert and Jerry Moss. Their first choice for a name was Carnival Records, under which they released two singles before discovering that another label had already taken the Carnival name. The company was subsequently renamed A&M, after Alpert's and Moss's initials. From 1966 to 1999, the company's headquarters were on the grounds of the historic Charlie Chaplin Studios at 1416 North La Brea Avenue, near Sunset Boulevard in Hollywood.

Throughout the 1960s and 1970s, A&M had such acts as Herb Alpert & the Tijuana Brass, Baja Marimba Band, Burt Bacharach, Sérgio Mendes & Brasil ’66,  Ralph Williams/The Marauders, the Sandpipers, Boyce & Hart, We Five, the Carpenters, Chris Montez, Elkie Brooks, Lee Michaels, Captain and Tennille, the Flying Burrito Brothers, Quincy Jones, Lucille Starr, Stealers Wheel, Gallagher and Lyle, Barry DeVorzon, Perry Botkin, Jr., Marc Benno, Liza Minnelli, Rita Coolidge, Gino Vannelli, Wes Montgomery, Paul Desmond, Bobby Tench, Hummingbird, Toni Basil, and Paul Williams. Folk artists Joan Baez, Phil Ochs and Gene Clark also recorded for the label during the 1970s. Billy Preston joined the label in 1971, followed by Andre Popp and Herb Ohta in 1973.

In the late 1960s, through direct signing and licensing agreements, A&M added several British artists to its roster, including Cat Stevens, Joe Cocker, Procol Harum, Humble Pie, Fairport Convention, Free, the Move, Strawbs and Spooky Tooth. In the 1970s, under its manufacturing and distribution agreement with Ode Records, A&M released albums by Carole King and the comedy duo Cheech & Chong. Other notable acts of the time included Nazareth, Y&T, the Tubes, Styx, Supertramp, Joan Armatrading, Bell and James, Chris de Burgh (who went on to greater mainstream success in the 1980s), Rick Wakeman, the Ozark Mountain Daredevils, Chuck Mangione, Squeeze, and Peter Frampton. On March 10, 1977, A&M "signed" the Sex Pistols outside Buckingham Palace in a mock signing ceremony after the band had been dropped by EMI, although the real signing had actually occurred the prior day; however, A&M dropped the band within a week. 

A&M sustained its success during the 1980s with a roster of noted acts that included Orchestral Manoeuvres in the Dark, Henry Badowski, Janet Jackson, the Police, Sting, the Brothers Johnson, Falco, Atlantic Starr, the Go-Go's, Bryan Adams, Suzanne Vega, Righeira, Brenda Russell, Jeffrey Osborne, Oingo Boingo, the Human League, Ozark Mountain Daredevils, Sharon, Lois & Bram, Annabel Lamb,  Jim Diamond, Vital Signs, Joe Jackson, Charlie Peacock, and Scottish rock band Gun. They also, through a deal with Christian music label Myrrh, distributed back catalog recordings of Amy Grant as well as her new recordings, starting with 1985's Unguarded, to the mainstream marketplace, a vital component in her subsequent breakthrough as a mainstream artist.

Within a decade of its inception, A&M became the world's largest independent record company. A&M releases were initially issued in the United Kingdom by EMI's Stateside Records label, and then under its own name by Pye Records, who released the first Herb Alpert records on the Pye International label before issuing the records on  the A&M label until 1967. From 1969, A&M set up its own UK base appointing John Deacon (not to be confused with Queen's bass guitarist of the same name) as general manager, a post he held until 1979. Several A&R men were recruited including Larry Yaskiel, Derek Green and Mike Noble and major UK acts such as the Police, Supertramp, Rick Wakeman, Squeeze, Gallagher & Lyle, Elkie Brooks, the Strawbs and Peter Frampton as well as many others were all signed to the UK label. A&M releases were also issued in Australia through Festival Records until 1989. A&M Records Ltd. was established in 1970, with distribution handled by other labels with a presence in Europe. A&M Records of Canada Ltd. was also formed in 1970, and A&M Records of Europe in 1977. In 1979, A&M entered a distribution agreement with RCA Records in the US, and with CBS Records in many other countries.

Over the years, A&M added specialty imprints: Almo International for middle of the road; Omen Records (1964–1966) for soul; Horizon Records for jazz (1974–1978); AyM Discos for Latin-American; Vendetta Records for dance music (1988–1990); and  Tuff Break Records for hip-hop music (1993–1995).

Acquisition by PolyGram
A&M was bought by PolyGram for $500 million in 1989. Alpert and Moss continued to manage the label until 1993. In 1998, Alpert and Moss sued PolyGram for breach of the integrity clause, eventually settling for an additional $200 million payment.

In 1991, A&M launched Perspective Records as a joint venture with producing team Jimmy Jam and Terry Lewis.  Jam and Lewis stepped down as CEOs of the imprint in 1997, but they remained on as consultants. In 1999, the label was absorbed into A&M. In the mid-1990s, A&M began distributing its PolyGram sister label Polydor Records in the US.

During the 1990s, the company continued to release albums by Soundgarden, Extreme, Amy Grant, John Hiatt, Sting, Blues Traveler, Barry White, and Aaron Neville, as well as material from new artists Sheryl Crow, Monster Magnet, Therapy?, CeCe Peniston, Intelligent Hoodlum, Dred Scott, Ridel High and Gin Blossoms.  The company released the soundtracks Robin Hood: Prince of Thieves, The Three Musketeers, Sabrina, The Living Sea, Demolition Man, and Lethal Weapon 3.

Universal Music Group merging and Interscope Geffen A&M
In 1998, PolyGram was bought by Seagram and merged into Universal Music Group, which was formed in 1996 as the successor to MCA Music Entertainment Group, of which MCA Records had been the flagship. A&M was subsequently merged into Universal Music Group's then newly formed Interscope Geffen A&M label group. Its Canadian division was absorbed into Universal Music Canada at that time, which included Jann Arden alongside other artists from Canada.

The A&M lot on La Brea Avenue was shut down in January 1999. During the farewell celebration, the company's staff placed a black band over the A&M sign above the main entrance, indicating the death of the company. The old A&M studios and executive offices are now the home of the Jim Henson Company, which operates Henson Recording Studios. Most of the company's workforce, some of whom had been with the company for a decade or more, were let go while many of its artists were dropped. The label's more prominent acts such as Sting, Sheryl Crow, Bryan Adams and Chris Cornell, however would remain on its roster.

In response to the down-sourcing, Al Cafaro stated, 

A&M catalog albums that didn't fit the current pop music format (which also includes rock, rap and R&B) of their new parent division were transferred to other Universal divisions for management - for example, Verve Records now manages A&M's jazz catalog, not including Herb Alpert's recorded output which Alpert acquired in the settlement with Universal Music (however, Verve does manage the Horizon Records catalog).

Despite the shutdown, the A&M name continued to be used on albums from artists like Snow Patrol, the Black Eyed Peas and Keyshia Cole—a result of Alpert and Moss's 1998 lawsuit—until February 2007, when Interscope-Geffen-A&M partnered with Octone Records to relaunch the A&M label fully. Now headed by James Diener and called A&M/Octone Records with worldwide distribution handled by parent Universal Music Group, the existing Octone roster was transferred to the A&M/Octone label and all newer artist signings were made under the A&M/Octone joint venture. Acts that were already signed to the label before the merger with Octone, however, would remain on the main A&M label.

After six successful years of operation, in September 2013, Octone initiated its buy/sell rights in the joint venture, resulting in Interscope-Geffen-A&M purchasing Octone Records' 50% interest in A&M/Octone, absorbing and restructuring the artist roster into Interscope operations in 2014 as announced.

Subsidiary and associated labels

Former

 1500 Records (1998–2001)
 Antra Records (1998)
 AM:PM (1990–2002, UK imprint for R&B, hip-hop and dance music)
 Almo Sounds (1994–1999)
 Breakout Records (1987–1990, UK imprint for R&B and Hip-Hop music)
 CTI Records (1967–1970)
 Cypress Records (1988–1990)
 Dark Horse Records (1974–1976)
 Delos International (1988–1990)
 Denon (1988–1992)
 DV8 Records (1995–1998)
 Flip Records (1996–1998)
 Gold Mountain Records (1983–1985)
 Heavyweight Records (1998)
 Horizon Records (1974–1978)
 Hollywood Records (1995-1999)
 Perspective Records (1991–1999)
 I.R.S. Records (1979–1985)
 Nimbus Records (1987–1990)
 Ode Records (1970–1975)
 Polydor Records (1995–1999)
 Rap-A-Lot Records (1988)
 Shelter Records (In Great Britain, early 1970s)
 Tabu Records (1991–1993)
 Tuff Break Records (1993–1995)
 TwinTone (1987–1989)
 T.W.Is.M (1996–1998)
 Vendetta Records (1988–1991)
 Windham Hill Records (and its subsidiary labels) (1982–1989)
 Word Records (and its subsidiary labels: Exit, Myrrh, Live Oak) (1985–1990)

Theatrical film release
 Birdy (1984 co-production with Tri-Star Pictures)
 Better Off Dead (1985, co-production with CBS Theatrical Films, distributed by Warner Bros. Pictures)
 The Breakfast Club (1985, co-production with Universal Pictures and Hughes Entertainment)
 Bring On the Night (1985)
 One Crazy Summer (1986, co-production with Warner Bros. Pictures)
 The Beast (1988)
 Blaze (1989)
 The Mighty Quinn (1989)
 Worth Winning (1989)
 Crooked Hearts (1991)
 A Midnight Clear (1992)
 A Home of Our Own (1993)
 House of Cards (1993)
 S.F.W. (1994)
 Mrs. Winterbourne (1996)

See also
 Gil Friesen - former President of A&M Records
 Interscope Records
 A&M Octone Records
 A&M Records, Inc. v. Napster, Inc.
 List of record labels
 Jim Henson Company Lot
 List of A&M Records artists

References

External links 
  - A&M Records is included within the Interscope site and is part of Interscope-Geffen-A&M
 A&M Records US/UK A&R contact list
 On A&M Records - Search every artist and recording by A&M Records and its affiliated labels
 A&M Corner - Since 1995 the internet's original A&M Records free collector/listener resource
 Finding Aid for the A&M Records Collection, Charles E. Young Research Library, University of California, Los Angeles

 
American record labels
Defunct record labels of the United States
Entertainment companies based in California
Companies based in Los Angeles
Companies based in Santa Monica, California
Record labels established in 1962
Record labels disestablished in 1999
Entertainment companies established in 1962
1962 establishments in California
1999 disestablishments in California
Rock record labels
Heavy metal record labels
Hip hop record labels
Pop record labels
Rhythm and blues record labels
Contemporary R&B record labels
Smooth jazz record labels
Soul music record labels
Defunct companies based in Greater Los Angeles
IFPI members
Labels distributed by Universal Music Group